Time-tracking software is a category of computer software that allows its employees to record time spent on tasks or projects. The software is used in many industries, including those who employ freelancers and hourly workers. It is also used by professionals who bill their customers by the hour. These include lawyers, freelancers and accountants. 

The time-tracking software tool can be used stand-alone or integrated with other applications like project management software, customer support and accounting. Time tracking software is the electronic version of the traditional paper timesheet. Aside from timesheet software, time-tracking software also includes time-recording software, which uses user activity monitoring (UAM) to record the activities performed on a computer and the time spent on each project and task.

Types of time-tracking software

 Timesheet  Allows users to manually enter time spent on tasks.
 Time-tracking/recording  Automatically records activities performed on a computer.

Time-tracking software can be:
 Standalone: Used only to record timesheets and generate reports.
 Integrated as part of:
 Accounting systems, e.g. timesheet data fed directly to company accounts.
 Billing systems, e.g. to generate invoices, especially for contractors, lawyers, etc.
 Project management systems, e.g. timesheet data used by project management software to visualize the effort being spent on projects or tasks.
 Payroll systems, e.g. to pay employees based on time worked.
 Resource scheduling, e.g. bi-directional integration allows schedulers to schedule staff to tasks, which, once complete, can be confirmed and converted to timesheets.

Timesheet software
Timesheet software is software used to maintain timesheets. It was popularized when computers were first introduced to the office environment with the goal of automating heavy paperwork for big organizations. Timesheet software allows entering time spent performing different projects and tasks.

When used within companies, employees enter the time they've spent on tasks into electronic timesheets. These timesheets can then be approved or rejected by supervisors or project managers.

Since 2006, timesheet software has been moving to mobile platforms (smartphones, tablets, smartwatches, etc.) enabling better tracking of employees whose work involves multiple locations.

Time-tracking/recording software
Time-tracking/recording software automates the time-tracking process by recording the activities performed on a computer and the time spent on each of them. This software is intended to be an improvement over timesheet software. Its goal is to offer a general picture of computer usage. Automatic time-tracking/recording software records and shows the usage of applications, documents, games, websites, etc.

When used within companies, this software allows monitoring the productivity of employees by recording the tasks they perform on their computers. It can be used to help filling out timesheets.

When used by freelancers, this software helps to create reports for clients (e.g. timesheets and invoices) or to prove work that was done.

Time-tracking methods
There are several ways companies track employee time using time tracking software.

 Durational           Employees enter the duration of the task but not the times when it was performed.
 Chronological        Employees enter start and end times for the task.
 Automatic The system automatically calculates time spent on tasks or whole projects, using a connected device or a personal computer, and user input using start and stop buttons. Users can retrieve logged tasks and view the duration, or the start and stop times.
 Exception-based      The system automatically records standard working hours except for approved time off or LOA.
 Clock-in clock-out   Employees manually record arrival and departure times.
 Monitoring           The system records active and idle time of employees. It might also record screen captures.
 Location-based       The system determines the working status of employees based on their location.

 Resource-scheduling: by scheduling resources in advance, employees schedules can be easily converted to timesheets.

Benefits of time-tracking software
Tracking time can increase productivity, as businesses can track time spent on tasks and get a better understanding of what practices causes the employees to waste time. Time tracking software enhances accountability, by documenting the time it takes to finish given tasks. The data is collected in database and could be used for data analysis by the human resources departments. Features offered by time-tracking software include:
 Automatic generation of invoices to the professional's clients or customers based on the time spent.
 Tracking of cost overruns for fixed cost projects.
 workforce management packages which track attendance, employee absences, human resources issues, payroll, talent management, and labor analytics.
 Helps to track productive and non-productive hours.
 Create accountability and transparency between employers and employees. 
 It helps evaluate the team’s workflow.

See also 
Comparison of time-tracking software
Computer surveillance
Employee-scheduling software
Meeting scheduling tool
Project-management software
Schedule (workplace)
Time and attendance
Time management

References 

 
Accounting software
Business software
Time management